I Love to Polka is an album by Jimmy Sturr and His Orchestra, released through Rounder Records in 1995. In 1996, the album won Sturr the Grammy Award for Best Polka Album.

Track listing
 "It's Party Time" (Zalac) – 2:41
 "Dancing Clarinets" (Sturr) – 2:14
 "Bed of Roses" (Urbanovitch) – 2:34
 "I L.O.V.E. Y.O.U." (Brown, Sturr) – 3:02
 "Button Box Fever" (Rink) – 2:23
 "Gettin' Married" (Biskup) – 2:28
 "I Love to Polka" (Filipowski) – 3:10
 "Nat the Cat" (Will) – 2:45
 "My Mary" (Resetar) – 2:45
 "Skylark" (Solek) – 2:47
 "Last Night" (Rink) – 2:47
 "Here We Come/The Polish Polka" (Sturr) – 2:40
 "Blaze of Glory" (Keith, Morrison, Slate) – 2:45

Personnel

 Gene Bartkiewicz – accordion
 Doyle Brown – visual coordinator
 Basia Ciborowski – vocals
 Dennis Coyman – drums
 Todd Culross – assistant engineer
 Wally Czerniawski – accordion
 Dave Czohara – trumpet
 Will Dombrowski – engineer
 Nancy Given – design
 Ken Harbus – trumpet
 The Jordanaires – vocals, group
 Johnny Karas – tenor saxophone, vocals
 Ella Kuzdzal – vocals
 Joe Magnuszewski – clarinet, alto saxophone

 Jeff Miller – piano
 Al Noble – trumpet
 Eric Parks – trumpet
 Tom Pick – producer, engineer, mixing
 Dennis Polisky – clarinet, alto saxophone
 Mike Ralff – bass
 Lynn Marie Rink – accordion
 Bill Shibilski – liner notes
 Jimmy Sturr – clarinet, arranger, alto saxophone, producer, mixing
 Frank Urbanovitch – fiddle, vocals
 Shonna Valeska – photography
 Henry Will – arranger
 Hank Williams – mastering

See also
 Polka in the United States

References

1995 albums
Grammy Award for Best Polka Album
Jimmy Sturr albums
Rounder Records albums